Dejan Ljubičić (born 8 October 1997) is an Austrian professional footballer who plays as a midfielder for Bundesliga club 1. FC Köln and the Austria national team.

International career
Ljubičić was born in Austria to Bosnian Croat parents from Busovača. He debuted for the Austria national team in a 2–0 2022 FIFA World Cup qualification win over the Faroe Islands on 9 October 2021.

Personal life
In August 2021, he was sentenced for throwing bottles at a mosque in Kiseljak three years earlier. He had to pay a fine of 1,000 BAM or serve ten days in prison.

His younger brother Robert plays for Dinamo Zagreb.

Career statistics

Club

Notes

International

International goal
Scores and results list Austria's goal tally first.

References

External links

1997 births
Living people
Austrian footballers
Austria international footballers
Association football midfielders
Austrian people of Croatian descent
Austrian people of Bosnia and Herzegovina descent
Footballers from Vienna
Austrian Football Bundesliga players
2. Liga (Austria) players
SK Rapid Wien players
SC Wiener Neustadt players
1. FC Köln players
Austrian expatriate footballers
Expatriate footballers in Germany
Austrian expatriate sportspeople in Germany